The Belgian Bowl XIV was played on June 3, 2001 and was won by the Izeghem Redskins. 700 people attended the final in the stadium of RC Gent.

Playoffs

References

External links
Official Belgian Bowl website

American football in Belgium
Belgian Bowl
Belgian Bowl